Bernays is a surname. Notable people with the surname include:

 Adolphus Bernays (1795–1864), professor of German in London; brother of Isaac Bernays and father of:
 Lewis Adolphus Bernays (1831–1908), public servant and agricultural writer in Australia; son of Adolphus Bernays
 Edward Bernays (1891–1995), the "father of public relations"; great-grandson of Isaac Bernays and father of:
 Anne Bernays (born 1930), American novelist; daughter of Edward Bernays and American novelist Doris E. Fleischman
 Isaac Bernays (1792–1849), German rabbi; brother of Adolphus Bernays and father of:
 Jakob Bernays (1824–1881), German classical linguist
 Michael Bernays (1834–1897), German literature historian
 Karl Ludwig Bernays (1815–1876), Marxist journalist
 Marie Bernays (1883–1939), German politician and educator
 Martha Bernays (1861–1951), wife of Sigmund Freud; granddaughter of Isaac Bernays by his son Berman
 Paul Bernays (1888–1977), Swiss mathematician born in London; great-grandson of Isaac Bernays
 Robert Bernays (1902–1945), Liberal MP; great-grandson of Adolphus Bernays
 Thekla M. Bernays (1856–1931), women's suffrage's activist, author and lecturer

See also 
 Bernays family
 Bernay (disambiguation)

Jewish surnames